Juha Wuolijoki is a Finnish director, writer and producer and the CEO-founder of the production and distribution company Snapper Films. Founded in 1998, Snapper Films is based in Helsinki and Los Angeles and it's one of the leading production companies in Finland.
Juha has a Master of Arts Degree (1995) from the University of Arts and Design (Aalto University). He's best known as the director, co-writer and producer of award-winning features Gourmet Club (2004), Christmas Story (2007) and Hella W (2011).

Juha Wuolijoki is a member of Producers Council in the Producers Guild of America (PGA) and the European Film Academy (EFA).

Career 

Netflix and Amazon Prime in US have released feature films that Wuolijoki has directed and produced.
One of the latest Snapper Films productions is Zarra's Law (2014), a crime drama set in New York starring Tony Sirico, Brendan Fehr, Erin Cummings and Burt Young. Finnish box office hits, family features Ella and Friends and Ella and Friends 2, produced by Juha Wuolijoki, opened theatrically in Finland during the holiday seasons 2012 and 2013. Other recent projects include executive producing of French comedy feature Let My People Go!. The Finnish drama feature Hella W, directed and produced by Juha Wuolijoki, was premiered theatrically in Finland and Scandinavia in January 2011. The film won two Jussi Awards in Finland. In 2009, Snapper Films entered into co-operation with the production company Black Forest Films. The co-operation started with Juha Wuolijoki co-producing the comedy feature Father, Son and a Holy Cow (2011). The Bollywood film Shamitabh (2015), starring Amitabh Bachchan and Dhanush, was shot partly in Finland. Snapper Films is a Finnish production company for the film.

Snapper Films’ family feature Christmas Story was the top-grossing Finnish film of 2007 and has spread wider than any other Finnish live-action feature. The film has sold to 120 countries with theatrical releases in several territories. Christmas Story has been selected to several international festivals, including Film Festival Cine-Jeune de l'Aisne in France, Chicago Children's Film Festival and Zlin - 48th International Film Festival for Children and Youth in Czech Republic. At the 10th Sarasota Film Festival, Christmas Story won the Audience Award for Best in World Cinema in 2008 . In Finland, the film won two Jussi Awards and was theatrically re-released in 2008 and 2009. On DVD/Blu-ray, Christmas Story was the first-ever Finnish feature to sell Platinum (100.000 units).

In 2004, Juha produced and directed the Finnish-language television film Gourmet Club. The film won the Venla award for best television movie of the year , as well as the Golden Nymph award for best screenplay at the 45th Monte Carlo Television Festival and Best Foreign Film at the Long Island International Film Expo in New York . Juha has also directed, adapted and translated numerous radio plays.

Filmography

Film
  Shamitabh (2015) - producer, Finland
 Zarra's Law (2014) -  director, producer
 Ella and Friends 2 (2013)  -  producer
 Ella and Friends (2012) -  producer
 Let My People Go! (2011)  - producer: Finland
 Father, Son and The Holy Cow (2011) -  co-producer
 Hella W (2011) - director, producer, co-writer
 Christmas Story (2007) - director, producer, writer

TV
 Kaikki kunnossa (TV Series, 4 episodes, 2007) - director
 Gourmet Club (2004) - director, producer, writer

References

External links
 

Place of birth missing (living people)
1969 births
Living people
Finnish directors
Finnish film producers
Aalto University alumni
20th-century Finnish male artists
20th-century Finnish businesspeople
21st-century Finnish male artists
21st-century Finnish businesspeople
Finnish business executives